Samuel Thompson (May 27, 1908 – January 29, 1978), nicknamed "Sad Sam", was an American pitcher in the Negro leagues from 1932 to 1942.

A native of Sulligent, Alabama, Thompson attended Sumner High School and Wiley College. He pitched for over a decade in the Negro leagues, and was often ranked among the league's top hurlers.

Thompson died in Los Angeles, California in 1978 at age 69.

References

External links
 and Baseball-Reference Black Baseball stats and Seamheads

1908 births
1978 deaths
Chicago American Giants players
Columbus Elite Giants players
Indianapolis ABCs (1931–1933) players
Kansas City Monarchs players
Philadelphia Stars players
Pollock's Cuban Stars players
Baseball pitchers
People from Lamar County, Alabama
Baseball players from Alabama
20th-century African-American sportspeople